Lyubovitsa is a rural locality (a village) in Ustretskoye Rural Settlement, Syamzhensky District, Vologda Oblast, Russia. The population was 15 as of 2002.

Geography 
Lyubovitsa is located 30 km northwest of Syamzha (the district's administrative centre) by road. Rechkovskaya is the nearest rural locality.

References 

Rural localities in Syamzhensky District